In mathematics, a zero-dimensional topological space (or nildimensional space) is a topological space that has dimension zero with respect to one of several inequivalent notions of assigning a dimension to a given topological space. A graphical illustration of a nildimensional space is a point.

Definition
Specifically:
 A topological space is zero-dimensional with respect to the Lebesgue covering dimension if every open cover of the space has a refinement which is a cover by disjoint open sets.
 A topological space is zero-dimensional with respect to the finite-to-finite covering dimension if every finite open cover of the space has a refinement that is a finite open cover such that any point in the space is contained in exactly one open set of this refinement.
 A topological space is zero-dimensional with respect to the small inductive dimension if it has a base consisting of clopen sets.
The three notions above agree for separable, metrisable spaces.

Properties of spaces with small inductive dimension zero
 A zero-dimensional Hausdorff space is necessarily totally disconnected, but the converse fails. However, a locally compact Hausdorff space is zero-dimensional if and only if it is totally disconnected. (See  for the non-trivial direction.)
 Zero-dimensional Polish spaces are a particularly convenient setting for descriptive set theory. Examples of such spaces include the Cantor space and Baire space.
 Hausdorff zero-dimensional spaces are precisely the subspaces of topological powers  where  is given the discrete topology. Such a space is sometimes called a Cantor cube. If  is countably infinite,  is the Cantor space.

Manifolds
All points of a zero-dimensional manifold are isolated. 

In particular, the zero-dimensional hypersphere is a pair of points, and the zero-dimensional ball is a single point.

Notes

References

Dimension
0
Descriptive set theory
Properties of topological spaces
Space, topological